The SwissIX Internet Exchange (SwissIX) is an Internet Exchange Point (IXP) situated in Switzerland, currently in the following cities: Basel, Bern, Glattbrugg, Lupfig, Zürich. SwissIX is a fast-growing, non-profit, neutral and independent peering network. On 9 March 2001 SwissIX was established as an Association in Glattbrugg, operating under Swiss Law.

The SwissIX is the largest Internet Exchange Point in Switzerland, when measured by number of members and traffic. SwissIX is also member of the European Internet Exchange Association.

Network  
 NetIron MLXe-16 from Brocade Communications Systems as core IX switch
 FastIron X Series switches from Brocade Communications Systems as Edge switch

See also 
 List of Internet exchange points

References

External links
 Official website
 Traffic statistics

Internet in Switzerland
Internet exchange points in Switzerland